Joe E. Scruggs was an American football coach.  He was the second first head football coach at Tennessee A&I State Normal School for Negroes—now known as Tennessee State University—in Nashville, Tennessee and he held that position for three seasons, from 1922 to 1924, compiling a record of 7–3–1.

References

Year of birth missing
Year of death missing
Tennessee State Tigers football coaches